Karen Anderson is the name of

 Karen Anderson (writer) (1932–2018), American fantasy writer
 Karen Anderson (athlete) (born 1938), American javelin thrower
 Karen Anderson (squash) (born 1971), Jamaican squash player